The Centre for Process Innovation Limited (CPI) is a British technology and innovation social enterprise, headquartered in the North East of England. Established in 2004 by the UK Government agency ONE NorthEast, the company was one of five centres of excellence in a long-term strategy to "reposition the North-East [of England] on the world stage for research and development".

Role 
CPI helps companies to develop, prove, prototype and scale-up new products and processes by providing access to facilities, expertise and networks of public and private funders.

CPI is a founding partner in the High Value Manufacturing Catapult, a network of technology and innovation centres designed to transform the UK's capability for innovation in specific technology areas and markets to help drive future economic growth.

Facilities 

The company has seven innovation facilities in northern England and one in Scotland:

 National Industrial Biotechnology Centre, Wilton, Redcar
 National Printable Electronics Centre, at NETPark, Sedgefield
 National Formulation Centre, NETPark, Sedgefield
 National Healthcare Photonics Centre, NETPark, Sedgefield
 The Graphene Application Centre, NETPark, Sedgefield
 National Biologics Manufacturing Centre, Darlington
 The RNA Centre of Excellence, Darlington
 The Medicines Manufacturing Innovation Centre, Glasgow

Funding 

In 2011, CPI joined the UK Government's Catapult centres network. It has also received funding from the European Regional Development Fund and the EU's Horizon 2020 programme. Further funding through the Catapult network was announced in 2018.

References

External links 
 

Research organisations in the United Kingdom
2003 establishments in the United Kingdom
Catapult centres